SEBS may refer to:
Styrene-Ethylene-Butadiene-Styrene a Thermoplastic elastomer
a Points of the compass (SEbS)